Edson Francisco Enrique Arturo Morúa Garza (born August 8, 1990, in Saltillo, Coahuila) is a professional Mexican footballer who currently plays for Murciélagos F.C. in the Liga Premier de México.

Career
Born in Saltillo, Morúa began his professional football career playing as a midfielder for Club Santos Laguna "A" in the Primera División A during 2008. He would eventually make a late substitute's appearance for Santos Laguna's first team in the 2011–12 CONCACAF Champions League group stage against Colorado Rapids. He has also played for Real Saltillo Soccer, Unión de Curtidores and Murciélagos.

References

External links
Profile at Soccerway

1990 births
Living people
Association football midfielders
Sportspeople from Saltillo
Footballers from Coahuila
Mexican footballers
Santos Laguna footballers
Murciélagos FC footballers